Florencio Durán Bernales (1893-1978) was a Chilean physician, lawyer, and politician. As member of the Radical Party of Chile he served as President of the Senate of Chile from 1941 to 1944. He ran also as pre-candidate for the Radical Party in 1942 but lost to Juan Antonio Ríos, who then won the elections.

References 

1893 births
1978 deaths
People from Rancagua
Chilean people of Spanish descent
Radical Party of Chile politicians
Deputies of the XXXVI Legislative Period of the National Congress of Chile
Deputies of the XXXVII Legislative Period of the National Congress of Chile
Presidents of the Senate of Chile
Candidates for President of Chile
20th-century Chilean physicians
University of Chile alumni